The Campbell Trophy was a non-championship Grand Prix held at Brooklands, Great Britain in 1937, 1938 and 1939. The most successful driver was Prince Bira. He won the first two races and came second in the third race.

Results

Sources
 www.kolumbus.fi, 1937 Campbell Trophy. Also 1938 and 1939 were used.
 YouTube, 1937 Campbell Trophy
 sl.wikipedia.org, 1937 Campbell Trophy. Also 1938 and 1939 were used.
 www.kolumbus.fi, Teddy Rayson
 Racing Sports Cars, Anthony Powys-Lybbe
 www.kolumbus.fi, Dennis Scribbans
 Racing Sports Cars, Arthur Dobson
 www.kolumbus.fi, Arthur Hyde
 Racing Sports Cars, Peter Aitken
 Racing Sports Cars, Reggie Tongue

Auto races in the United Kingdom
Pre-World Championship Grands Prix